Buhtz is a surname. Notable people with the surname include:

Herbert Buhtz (1911–2006), German rower
Horst Buhtz (1923–2015), German footballer and manager